The Wohl–Ziegler reaction
is a chemical reaction that involves the allylic or benzylic bromination of hydrocarbons using an N-bromosuccinimide and a radical initiator.

Best yields are achieved with N-bromosuccinimide in carbon tetrachloride solvent. Several reviews have been published.

In a typical setup, a stoichiometric amount of N-bromosuccinimide solution and a small quantity of initiator are added to a solution of the substrate in CCl4, and the reaction mixture is stirred and heated to the boiling point. Initiation of the reaction is indicated by more vigorous boiling; sometimes the heat source may need to be removed. Once all N-bromosuccinimide (which is denser than the solvent) has been converted to succinimide (which floats on top) the reaction has finished.  Due to the high toxicity and ozone-depleting nature of carbon tetrachloride, trifluorotoluene has been proposed as an alternative solvent suitable for the Wohl-Ziegler bromination.

The corresponding chlorination reaction cannot generally be achieved with N-chlorosuccinimide, although more specialized reagents have been developed, and the reaction can be achieved industrially with chlorine gas.

Mechanism 
The mechanism by which the Wohl-Ziegler reaction proceeds was proposed by Paul Goldfinger in 1953, and his reaction mechanism is one of two proposed pathways through which aliphatic, allylic, and benzylic bromination with N-bromosuccinimide (NBS) occurs.  It has been shown that the Goldfinger mechanism is the proper mechanism as opposed to the previously accepted mechanism proposed by George Bloomfield, which, though consistent during selectivity studies, turned out to be overly simplistic.

The generation of NBS radicals depicted in the Bloomfield mechanism has been shown to be far more difficult than imagined when it was proposed, which is why it has failed as a proper model throughout the years; however, evidence suggests that the Bloomfield mechanism is still acceptable for the oxidation of alcohols using NBS. In the Goldfinger mechanism, the purpose of the NBS is simply to maintain a very low concentration of molecular bromine, while in the Bloomfield mechanism, its purpose is the generation of the initial radical used in the reaction, which again can be quite a difficult process.  This is because it requires a special consideration for the behavior of the NBS radical; the only way it can possibly function as proposed in Bloomfield's mechanism is if the dissociation energy for the N-Br bond in NBS is smaller than that for Br2, and much evidence has been seen to suggest contrary behavior.  Goldfinger's proposed mechanism does not require any special considerations, as all radical species are behaving normally, and it is partly because of this that his mechanism is regarded as correct.

To further explore the accepted reaction mechanism, it must be understood that there are competing radical pathways in any radical reaction; it is the same in this case, as addition and substitution pathways are competing.  Achieving the desired brominated product requires that the substitution pathway be dominant, and reaction conditions can indeed be manipulated to promote this pathway over the less desirable addition pathway.  Displayed below are the two pathways in their entirety; there are side reactions included in this figure for the sake of completeness, such as steps 6 and 8; these pathways are general for almost all radical reactions, so NBS is not pictured here, but its role will be discussed below.

The role of NBS in Goldfinger's mechanism is to promote the regeneration of molecular bromine, but one of the additional benefits of using NBS is that it maintains a low concentration of molecular bromine, which is key to promoting substitution over addition.  Rate laws have been developed that describe the competitive behavior of this reaction, and they show a strong dependence on the concentration of molecular bromine; given below are the two equations: one for high concentrations of bromine and one for low concentrations of bromine.
 High bromine concentrations: r(a/s) = k2a/k2s(1 + k4a/k3a[Br2]) where r(a/s) is the ratio of addition to substitution, and the k values correspond to constants describing the specific reaction steps pictured above under Competing Pathways.
 Low bromine concentrations: r(a/s) = k2ak3a[Br2]/k2sk4a where terms have the same definition as in the previous equation.  It can be seen that in the equation for low bromine concentrations, the ratio of addition to substitution is directly proportional to the concentration of molecular bromine, so lowering the bromine concentration would inhibit the addition pathway and promote a greater degree of brominated product formation.

See also 
 Free-radical halogenation

References

Halogenation reactions
Free radical reactions
Name reactions